Silvanus (died 7 September 355) was a Roman general of Frankish descent, usurper in Gaul against Emperor Constantius II for 28 days in AD 355.

Origin and career 

Silvanus was born in Gaul, the son of Bonitus, a Laetic Frankish general who had supported Constantine I in the civil war against Licinius. Like so many other Franks of his times, and like his father before him, he was a loyal and thoroughly romanized "barbarian" in the military service of the Empire. By AD 351, he held the rank of tribune and was one of the senior officers who defected to Emperor Constantius II at the Battle of Mursa Major, after initially supporting the usurper Magnentius. An able soldier, Silvanus was eventually promoted to the rank of magister peditum per Gallias, a crucial post, then in AD 352–353, Constantius personally entrusted him with the difficult task of driving the Alamanni tribesmen raiding and looting in Gaul back beyond the Rhine, and restoring the fast eroding Roman authority in the province. This Silvanus fulfilled partly by bribing the Alamanni chieftains with the taxes he had collected, partly by defeating the Alamanni in battle and partly by suppressing the local bagaudae insurrections flaring up again in central and northern Gaul.

Trial and usurpation 

The corrupt coterie of Constantius II managed to persuade the suspicious, paranoid emperor, that Silvanus was planning to seize power. According to Ammianus, the praetorian prefect Lampadius and the ex-treasurer of the privy purse, Eusebius, used a sponge to alter a letter sent by Silvanus to his friends in Rome. The altered letter suggested that Silvanus was attempting to win support within the Senate for a coup. Constantius' court clique, with the exception of fellow Frankish generals Malarich and Mallobaudes, was uniformly against Silvanus. Courtiers Apodemius and Dynamius forged further correspondence that cast doubt on Silvanus' loyalty. Constantius then held a trial where Silvanus' allies were successful in defeating the spurious charges against the general. But Silvanus, unaware of the success of his supporters, responded to the threat of condemnation and execution by actually proclaiming himself emperor on 11 August 355 in Colonia Agrippina (modern Cologne). 
Late Roman historian Michael Kulikowski has argued that the entire episode was a later invention, created as an excuse to rid Constantius II of Silvanus before he became a threat. His primary basis of this argument is the fact that no coins minted with Silvanus' image have been found to date, since virtually every usurper minted coins as an attempt to legitimize his authority.

Death of Silvanus 

Constantius II, who was staying in Milan, ordered Silvanus to present himself at court, then sent Ursicinus to take over Silvanus' post. Ursicinus was himself at odds with Constantius' clique, and Silvanus no doubt trusted the veteran general. The letter that Ursicinus gave to Silvanus did not indicate that Constantius already knew of Silvanus' bid for power, so Silvanus considered himself safe. However it seems that Ursicinus betrayed and then arranged for the murder of Silvanus by co-opting some of the rebel soldiery. These men killed the usurper's guards and cornered Silvanus, who was on his way to church, then hacked him to death with their weapons.

Ammianus's report of Silvanus' death 

It has been suggested by at least one scholar that Ammianus invented the entire coup attempt to gloss over the role played by his patron, Ursicinus, in the murder of a fellow general. This theory suggests that Constantius had grown suspicious of the popular Frankish general and so offered his post to Ursicinus, who then murdered his peer in the course of a botched change of command. It has been noted that Silvanus did not mint any coinage (which would have been a clear indication of a usurpation attempt), unlike other equally short-lived usurpers of the era, such as Poemenius. However, the thesis of a concocted coup attempt is generally rejected by scholars. The lack of numismatic evidence is not determinative, because Trier, the nearest minting centre to Colonia Agrippina, closed its gates to Silvanus.

Ammianus concludes his treatment of the Silvanus episode:

References

Notes

Citations

Sources 

 The story of Silvanus short reign is told by Ammianus Marcellinus in his  History, at 15.5, with further details scattered through the rest of his work
 Biography of Silvanus DiMaio, Michael, "Silvanus (355 A.D.)", De Imperatoribus Romanis
 Cameron, Averil and Garnsey, Peter (Eds.). (1998). The Cambridge Ancient History: Volume 13, the Late Empire, AD 337–425. Cambridge: Cambridge University Press. 
 Sir Ronald Syme, Ammianus and the Historia Augusta (Oxford: 1968). 
 J.F. Matthews, The Roman Empire of Ammianus (London: 1989).
  T.D. Barnes, "Ammianus Marcellinus and the Representation of Historical Reality" (Ithaca: 1998). 
 Jan Willem Drijvers and David Hunt, eds., The Late Roman World and its Historian: Interpreting Ammianus Marcellinus (London, 1999). 
 D.C. Nutt, "Silvanus and the Emperor Constantius II" 7 9 (1973) Antichthon 80–89.

355 deaths
4th-century Frankish people
4th-century Roman usurpers
Assassinated Roman politicians
Frankish warriors
Generals of Constantius II
Magistri peditum
Year of birth unknown